Zaman is the second album of the celebrated Lebanese singer, Amal Hijazi. Ranging from fast-beat, pop songs like "Comme çi, Comme ça", "Einak"  and "Romansyia" to classical love-ballads like its title track "Zaman" and "Oulhali" this album is considered to be one of the most popular and biggest-selling albums Arabic albums ever. The title track, "Zaman", became a blockbuster hit and the music video was broadcast all over the Arab Satellite Channels. Even today, "Zaman" is considered one of the greatest Arabic hits ever and is perhaps Hijazi's best known song. Many fans consider this particular album that rose Hijazi to her fame.

Overview

Release

The anticipated release of Zaman caused the unprecedented popularity of Amal Hijazi to be reached all over the Middle East, gathering fans and admirers throughout all Arab countries. Critics and fans were all thrilled alike. Hijazi conquered the music market and sales of the album exceeded expectations. Zaman is also one of the biggest selling Arabic albums ever.

Soon, after the album's release, it saw Hijazi launch a major world tour. Her huge popularity caused her to land an endorsement deal with the Panasonic company. Hijazi starred in commercials in which she was seen promoting Panasonic products. They also included her hit singles off this blockbuster-hit album.

Singles

"Einak" ("Your Eyes") released was the album's lead single which a great duet with the Raï star Faudel. The song was played heavily on the radio and the music video was broadcast all over the Arab Satellite Channels. It is considered to be the video that made Hijazi the popular pop-star she is today.

Zaman also had another single "Romansyia" was also a big hit for Hijazi and was popular especially among teenage girls. In total, Zaman released four hit singles that remained on the top charts for weeks.

Track listing 

 "Ideely" ( "Pray for me")
 "Zaman" ( "Long time ago")
 "Einak Einak" ( "Your Eyes")
 "Weely Wah"
 "Ya Allah" ( "O God")
 "Zein Al-Rouh"
 "Romansyia" ( "Romance")
 "Al-Hawa"
 "Oulhali"  ( "Say it to me")
 "Albi Dhowa"
 "Comme ci, Comme ça" ("Like This, Like That")
 "Mali Meel"

Singles 

 "Zaman"
 "Romansyia"
 "Oulhali"
 "Einak Einak"

See also

Zaman (Song)
Faudel

External links 
Zaman

Amal Hijazi albums
2002 albums